Bruno Piazzalunga (born 25 October 1944 in Chiomonte, Italy) is a retired Italian alpine skier who competed in the 1968 Winter Olympics.

References

External links
 

1944 births
Living people
Italian male alpine skiers
Olympic alpine skiers of Italy
Alpine skiers at the 1968 Winter Olympics
People from the Province of Turin
20th-century Italian people